The Slovenia national football team has appeared at the UEFA European Championship once, in 2000. During the qualifiers, they finished second in the group with Norway, Greece, Latvia, Albania and Georgia. In the playoffs, Slovenia defeated Ukraine 3–2 on aggregate and qualified for their first major tournament.

At the championship, held in Belgium and the Netherlands, Slovenia were drawn into group C together with Spain, Yugoslavia and Norway. In their inaugural match, Slovenia was leading 3–0 against Yugoslavia, but the match ended in a 3–3 draw. In the second match, Slovenia narrowly lost to Spain. Their last game against Norway ended in a goalless draw. With two points, Slovenia ended last in their group. Zlatko Zahovič was the country's star player as he scored three out of four Slovenian goals.

Overall record

Euro 2000

Group stage

In the first game of the group, Slovenia stunned FR Yugoslavia and took a 3–0 lead after one hour of play, with Zlatko Zahovič scoring twice and Miran Pavlin once. After the red card of Siniša Mihajlović it looked like the team would have won its first game, but then Yugoslavia made a comeback as they scored three goals in the span of six minutes. In the second game, Spain took the 1–0 lead quickly as Raúl scored in the fourth minute. Slovenia equalised after one hour of play as Zahovič scored his third goal of the tournament. Only one minute later, Spain again took the lead as Joseba Etxeberria scored a game-winning goal. Around 10,000 Slovenian fans gathered to see the match at Amsterdam Arena, which is still a record for the most Slovenian spectators on a football game outside Slovenia. In the last round of the group stage Slovenia played against Norway and still had chances to progress to the quarter-finals. However, the match ended in a goalless draw and Slovenia won its second point of the tournament, but was still eliminated.

Goalscorers

References

 
Countries at the UEFA European Championship